Diao is the Mandarin pinyin romanization of the Chinese surname written  in Chinese character. It is romanized as Tiao in Wade–Giles. Diao is listed 148th in the Song dynasty classic text Hundred Family Surnames. As of 2008, it is the 245th most common surname in China, shared by 300,000 people.

Notable people
 Diao Jian (刁间), one of the richest merchants of the Western Han dynasty
 Diao Zidu (刁子都; died 26 AD), Xin dynasty rebel leader
 Diao Xie (刁協; died 322), Eastern Jin dynasty prime minister
 Diao Yi (刁彝), son of Diao Xie, avenged his father's death
 Diao Yong (刁雍; 390–484), Eastern Jin official, great-grandson of Diao Xie
 Diao Guangyin or Diao Guang (刁光胤; ca. 852–935), Tang dynasty painter
 George Tiao (刁錦寰; born 1933), statistician, member of the Academia Sinica
 Diao Wenyuan (刁文元; born 1943), table tennis player and coach
 David Diao (born 1943), Chinese-American artist
 Diao Guoxin (刁国新; born 1958), PLA lieutenant general
 Diao Yinan (born 1969), filmmaker and actor
 Diao Xiaojuan (born 1986), female Hong Kong cyclist 
 Barbie Diao (刁扬; born 1990), model
 Diao Linyu (刁琳宇; born 1994), women's volleyball player
 Chuti Tiu, American actress

See also
Salif Diao, Senegalese footballer

References

Chinese-language surnames
Individual Chinese surnames